Benjamin Malone, Jr. (February 3, 1952 – March 19, 2020) was an American football running back. He played in college at Arizona State University. He was drafted in the second-round (47th overall selection) in the 1974 NFL draft by the Miami Dolphins. He also played for the Washington Redskins.

Early life 
Malone grew up in Eloy, Arizona and attended Santa Cruz Valley Union High School.

College career 
He played college football at Arizona State and was drafted in the second round (47th overall) of the 1974 NFL Draft by the Miami Dolphins.

At Arizona State in 1971 he ran for 857 yards and 4 TD while averaging 8.2 yards per carry. 1973 he ran for 1,129 yards and 15 TD while averaging 6.4 yards per carry. He joined the Sun Devil Sports Hall of Fame in 1983.

Professional career

Miami Dolphins
Malone was drafted by the Miami Dolphins in the second round (47th overall selection) of the 1974 NFL Draft. He played for the Dolphins from 1974–1977. In his Miami career, Malone carried the ball 503 times totaling 2,129 yards and 16 rushing touchdowns.  His most significant contribution came in the 1974 Divisional Playoff game at the Oakland Raiders. Playing for the injured Mercury Morris, Malone ran for 83 yards on 14 carries, including a 23-yard touchdown run with 2:08 remaining that appeared to give Miami the win. But the Raiders scored with 26 seconds left. The TD play became known as "The Sea of Hands" catch.

Washington Redskins
Six games into the 1978 season, Malone was traded to the Washington Redskins. He played for the Washington Redskins for the 1978 and 1979 seasons.

Personal life and death
Malone's brother Art Malone also played running back at Arizona State and in the NFL. 

He died on March 19, 2020, aged 68 from complications due to diabetes.

References 

1952 births
2020 deaths
People from Eloy, Arizona
Sportspeople from the Phoenix metropolitan area
Sportspeople from Tyler, Texas
Players of American football from Arizona
Players of American football from Texas
American football running backs
Arizona State Sun Devils football players
Miami Dolphins players
Washington Redskins players
Deaths from diabetes